This is a list of bridges and viaducts in Peru, including those for pedestrians and vehicular traffic.

Historical and architectural interest bridges

Major road and railway bridges 
The modular suspension bridges have a great success in Peru, the type of bridge developed by the Austrian company Waagner-Biro has the advantage of being simple and quick to implement. These bridges can be made by locals or unskilled workers, the components are fixed and assembled on site, so no welding is required. The company was in charge of building the longest suspension bridge in the country, the Continental Bridge (also known as the President Guillermo Billinghurst Bridge), the elements of which were delivered in 1981, but for political reasons the project did not resume until 2004 and the inauguration took place in 2011. This bridge is part of the Interoceanic Highway which provides a link between Brazil and Peru.

The company SIMA (Shipyard Marine Industrial Services) specialized in shipbuilding, has an important activity in the construction of bridges in Peru, it has produced nearly 300 metal bridges across the country (2013).

See also 

 Transport in Peru
 Highways in Peru
 Rail transport in Peru
 Geography of Peru
 List of rivers of Peru

Notes and references 
 Notes

 

 

 Others references

Further reading

External links 

 
 
 
 
 
 

Peru
 
Bridges
Bridges